The 2001–02 Slovenian Ice Hockey League season was the 11th season of the Slovenian Hockey League. Olimpija have won the league championships.

First round

Final round

Play-offs

Final
22 March 2002, Olimpija – Jesenice: 1–2 n.V. (1–1, 0–0, 0–0, 0–1)
25 March 2002, Jesenice – Olimpija : 3–5 (1–1, 2–1, 0–3)
28 March 2002, Olimpija – Jesenice: 2–3 (0–1, 1–0, 1–2)
31 March 2002, Jesenice – Olimpija : 0–4 (0–2, 0–1, 0–1)
2 April 2002, Olimpija  – Jesenice: 3–2 (0–1, 1–0, 2–1)
4 April 2002, Jesenice – Olimpija : 2–5 (0–1, 1–1, 1–3)

3rd place
22 March 2002, Bled – Slavija : 4–3 n.P. (1–1, 1–0, 1–2, 0–0, 1–0)
25 March 2002, Slavija  – Bled: 2–1 (1–0, 0–1, 1–0)
28 March 2002, Bled – Slavija : 4–3 n.V. (0–2, 3–0, 0–1, 1–0)
31 March 2002, Slavija  – Bled: 5–4 (1–1, 3–2, 1–1)
2 April 2002, Bled – Slavija : 4–1 (1–1, 2–0, 1–0)

5th place

1
Slovenia
Slovenian Ice Hockey League seasons